In mathematics, specifically commutative algebra, a proper ideal Q of a commutative ring A is said to be primary if whenever xy is an element of Q then x or yn is also an element of Q, for some n > 0. For example, in the ring of integers Z, (pn) is a primary ideal if p is a prime number.

The notion of primary ideals is important in commutative ring theory because every ideal of a Noetherian ring has a primary decomposition, that is, can be written as an intersection of finitely many primary ideals. This result is known as the Lasker–Noether theorem. Consequently, an irreducible ideal of a Noetherian ring is primary.

Various methods of generalizing primary ideals to noncommutative rings exist, but the topic is most often studied for commutative rings. Therefore, the rings in this article are assumed to be commutative rings with identity.

Examples and properties

 An ideal Q of R is primary if and only if every zero divisor in R/Q is nilpotent.  (Compare this to the case of prime ideals, where P is prime if and only if every zero divisor in R/P is actually zero.)
 Any prime ideal is primary, and moreover an ideal is prime if and only if it is primary and semiprime (also called radical ideal in the commutative case).
 Every primary ideal is primal.
 If Q is a primary ideal, then the radical of Q is necessarily a prime ideal P, and this ideal is called the associated prime ideal of Q. In this situation, Q is said to be P-primary.
 An ideal whose radical is maximal, however, is primary.
 If P is a maximal prime ideal, then any ideal containing a power of P is P-primary. Not all P-primary ideals need be powers of P, but at least they contain a power of P; for example the ideal (x, y2) is P-primary for the ideal P = (x, y)  in the ring k[x, y], but is not a power of P, however it contains P².
 A finite nonempty product of -primary ideals is -primary but an infinite product of -primary ideals may not be -primary; since for example, in a Noetherian local ring with maximal ideal ,  (Krull intersection theorem) where each  is -primary, for example the infinite product of the maximal (and hence prime and hence primary) ideal  of the local ring  yields the zero ideal, which in this case is not primary (because the zero divisor  is not nilpotent). In fact, in a Noetherian ring, a nonempty product of -primary ideals  is -primary if and only if there exists some integer  such that .

Footnotes

References

Bourbaki, Algèbre commutative.

On primal ideals, Ladislas  Fuchs

External links
Primary ideal at Encyclopaedia of Mathematics

Commutative algebra
Ideals (ring theory)